The Koalisyon ng Nagkakaisang Pilipino (KNP) (Coalition of United Filipinos), also known as the United Opposition, was the political multi-party electoral alliance of the dominant opposition in the Philippines during the 2004 general elections. The KNP was composed of the Laban ng Demokratikong Pilipino (Fight of Democratic Filipinos) or LDP, the Partido Demokratiko Pilipino-Lakas ng Bayan or PDP–Laban, and the Pwersa ng Masang Pilipino (PMP) of deposed president Joseph Estrada,  a former movie star.

The leading party of this coalition is the Angara wing of the Laban ng Demokratikong Pilipino (Struggle of Democratic Filipinos) or LDP. The LDP split in late 2003 over issues on who is to be their standard bearer. Most of the party followed the lead of the president, Sen. Edgardo Angara especially with the support of the former president Joseph Estrada and former first lady Imelda Marcos. The other major party under this coalition is Estrada's Pwersa ng Masang Pilipino (PMP; Party of the Philippine Masses).

The KNP chose Fernando Poe Jr. (died December 14, 2004) as their candidate for president and Sen. Loren Legarda for vice-president in the 2004 Philippines elections.

After the 2004 elections, the KNP was replaced by the Genuine Opposition as the main opposition coalition.

KNP Senatorial Slate

Election results

Presidential and vice presidential elections

Senatorial race
5 out of 12 candidates won the possible 12 seats in the Senate namely: (in order of votes received)
 Juan Ponce Enrile
 Jinggoy Estrada
 Alfredo Lim
 Jamby Madrigal
 Aquilino Pimentel Jr.

See also
Koalisyon ng Katapatan at Karanasan sa Kinabukasan (K-4, Coalition of Truth and Experience for Tomorrow), the KNP's rival coalition in the 2004 national elections.
Puwersa ng Masa (Force of the Masses), the opposition's coalition during the 2001 midterm elections.
Laban ng Makabayang Masang Pilipino (Struggle of Patriotic Filipino Masses), the opposition's coalition during the 1998 Philippine national elections.

External links
 Opposition questions Melo's appointment as poll chief - 26 January 2008

References

Defunct political party alliances in the Philippines